Jarell Carter (born August 7, 1995) is an American football cornerback who is currently a free agent. He played college football at Trinity International University.

College career
Carter recorded 156 tackles, 0.5 sacks, 30 interceptions, 28 passes defensed during his time at Trinity International.

Professional career

Arizona Cardinals
Carter signed with the Arizona Cardinals as an undrafted free agent on July 31, 2017. He was waived by the Cardinals on September 2, 2017. On November 13, 2017, Carter was signed to the Cardinals practice squad He signed a reserve/future contract with the Cardinals on January 2, 2018. He was waived by the Cardinals on May 1, 2018.

Tennessee Titans
On June 14, 2018, Carter signed with the Tennessee Titans. He was waived on August 11, 2018.

Oakland Raiders
On August 27, 2018, Carter was signed by the Oakland Raiders. He was waived on September 1, 2018.

References

External links

1995 births
Living people
African-American players of American football
American football cornerbacks
Trinity International Trojans football players
Arizona Cardinals players
Tennessee Titans players
Oakland Raiders players
Players of American football from Houston
21st-century African-American sportspeople